Juan Carlos de la Ossa (born 25 November 1976 in Cuenca) is a Spanish middle distance runner who mostly concentrates on the 5000 and 10,000 metres. He won a bronze medal in the latter event at the 2006 European Championships in Athletics. His personal best time is 27:27.80 minutes, achieved in April 2005 in Barakaldo.

Achievements

External links

1976 births
Living people
Spanish male long-distance runners
Olympic athletes of Spain
Athletes (track and field) at the 2008 Summer Olympics
European Athletics Championships medalists
People from Cuenca, Spain
Sportspeople from the Province of Cuenca